Leighton Broadcasting is a radio broadcasting company based in St. Cloud, Minnesota that owns several radio stations in St. Cloud as well as in Detroit Lakes, Minnesota and Grand Forks, North Dakota.

Stations owned

External links
Leighton Broadcasting website
Lakes Radio.net
Winona Radio.com
Voice of Alexandria

Radio broadcasting companies of the United States
Employee-owned companies of the United States